Babanki, or Kejom (Babanki: Kəjòm [kɘ̀d͡ʒɔ́m]), is the traditional language of the  people of the Western Highlands of Cameroon.

Geography and Classification 
Babanki is a member of the Center Ring subfamily of the Grassfields languages, which is in turn a member of the extensive Southern Bantoid subfamily (which includes the Bantu languages, such as Swahili) of the Atlantic-Congo branch of the hypothetical Niger-Congo language family. 

According to Ethnologue, there were 39,000 speakers of Babanki as of 2011, although the Endangered Languages Project states that the 39,000 figure represents the ethnic population while actual speakers of the language number around 20,000. 

Languages spoken nearby include the closely-related Ring languages Kom, Vengo, and Nsei to the east, and the more distantly related Eastern Grassfields languages Bafut, Mbili-Mbui, and Awing to the west. English, in particular Cameroonian Pidgin English, are commonly spoken as well, to the extent that the latter is beginning to replace Babanki in all domains, including the home. Additionally, some speakers may speak French, Cameroon's other official language besides English, and speakers living in Kejom Keku may also speak the nearby Kom language, depending on their level of interaction with the Kom community. 

It has two main varieties, based on the two villages it is spoken in. They exhibit slight phonetic, phonological, and lexical differences but are mutually intelligible. A distinct variety spoken by some members of a group of ethnic Fula who live in the hills surrounding Kejom Ketinguh has also been attested.

Phonology

Consonants 
Babanki has 25 consonant phonemes.

Babanki has some allophonic palatalization before front vowels . The velar plosives  are realized as palatalized [ ], respectively, and the labial-velar approximant  is realized as a labial-palatal approximant . This variation also applies to labialized consonants (e.g.  "up"), although labialized bilabials and labiodentals retain labial-velar secondary articulation.

Prenasalized consonants in Babanki (all oral consonants but  can appear as prenasalized) are realized in several ways depending upon the manner of articulation of the consonant in question. Preceding an obstruent and following a vowel, prenasalization is generally realized as a homorganic nasal stop (e.g. /kɘ̀ⁿt͡ʃík/→[kɘ̀ɲt͡ʃíʔ] "lid"), while preceding a sonorant and following a vowel, prenasalization is generally realized without full oral closure which tends to cause the preceding vowel to be nasalized (e.g.  "grass beetle"). Additionally, when a prenasalized consonant is word initial and has no preceding vowel, the nasal portion is often audibly syllabic and using the low tone (e.g.  "potato").

Vowels 
Babanki has eight vowel phonemes contrasting in height, roundness, and backing. Length distinction and nasalization also occur non-contrastively. Babanki is unusual in that it contrasts both the rounded and the unrounded close central vowels and the close and close-mid central unrounded vowels.  

Tone 
Babanki has both lexical tone and grammatical tone. At the phonological level it is described as simply having a distinction between low /˨/ and high /˦/ tonemes, although a number of derived surface tonal sequences have been observed. Rarely, contour tones can occur in non-derived environments.

The downstepped high and mid tones are phonetically identical, but are otherwise distinct; the downstepped high tone  occurs much more freely and creates a tone ceiling for successive high tones in the same tonal phrase, while the mid tone  must precede a high tone and is restricted to a few specific environments.

Phonotactics 
Typically, Babanki words are composed of a CV(C) stem with optional (C)V prefixes and suffixes.

Vowel coalescence is also quite significant in Babanki. For example, the phrase  "my speargrass" would be phonemically parsed:

Here, the sequence  coalesces into the long vowel . Although virtually all long vowels that occur in Babanki are due to this process, there are a few instances of long vowels that are not clearly derived, such as in the words  "which" and  "term of address for fon".

Sample

Linguistic studies 
Linguistic research has been conducted in the Babanki community since the late 1970s. SIL Cameroon and the Cameroon Association for Bible Translation and Literacy (CABTAL) have been actively engaged with the Babanki language and community since 1988 and 2004, respectively.

Babanki phonology 
Akumbu, Pius W. (1999). Nominal phonological processes in Babanki. University of Yaounde MA thesis.

Hyman, Larry M. (1979). Tonology of the Babanki noun. Studies in African Linguistics 10. 159–178.

Mutaka, Ngessimo & Esther Phubon. (2006). Vowel raising in Babanki. Journal of West African Languages 33 (1). 71–88.

Phubon, Esther. (1999). Aspects of Babanki phonology. University of Buea BA long essay.

Phubon, Esther. (2002). Phonology of the Babanki verb. University of Buea MA thesis.

Phubon, Esther. (2007). Lexical phonology of Babanki. University of Yaounde 1 DEA thesis.

Phubon, Esther. (2014). Phrasal phonology of Babanki: An outgrowth of other components of the grammar. University of Yaounde 1 dissertation.

Tamanji, Pius N. (1987). Phonology of Babanki. MA thesis, University of Yaounde.

Babanki grammar 
Akumbu, Pius W. (2008). Kejom (Babanki) – English lexicon. Ga’a Kejom Development Committee. Bamenda: AGWECAMS.

Akumbu, Pius W. (2009). Kejom tense system. In Tanda, Vincent, Pius Tamanji and Henry Jick. (eds.), Language, literature and social discourse in Africa: Essays in honor of Emmanuel N. Chia, 183–200. Buea: University of Buea.

Akumbu, Pius W. & Evelyn F. Chibaka. (2012). A pedagogic grammar of Babanki. Köln: Rüdiger Köppe Verlag.

Fungeh Abongkeyung Landeà. (2022). Babanki for beginners.

Babanki sociolinguistics 
Brye, Edward. 2001. Sociolinguistic survey of Babanki. (824) Yaounde: SIL.

Notes

Further reading

References

External links 
 ELAR archive of Multimedia Documentation of Babanki Ritual Speech
 Kejom-English Dictionary app for Android on the Google Play Store

Ring languages
Languages of Cameroon

C1:noun class 1
C2:noun class 2
C3:noun class 3
C7:noun class 7
ASS:associative marker
SUBJ:subject marker
DIR:directive
CONJ:conjunction that appears specifically between serialized verbs